Moopil Nair is a subgroup of the Nair caste.  They were naduvazhis and Desavazhis of tiny feudal kingdoms on the Malabar Coast, present-day Kerala state, South India. Among them was Kavalappara Moopil Nair, who ruled the small kingdom of Kavalappara Swaroopam.

References

Further reading 
 

Nair